Platanthera purpurascens, the purple petal bog orchid, is a terrestrial orchid of North America.

Description

Platanthera purpurascens plants are 24–80 cm tall. Flowering time is from July to August. Flowers are green to yellowish-green with a lip that can be reddish (leading to the common name). The lip is 4-8 mm long and flowers have a short nectar spur which is 2–3 mm long.

Distribution and habitat

Platanthera purpurascens is endemic to the United States, occurring in Arizona, California, Colorado, New Mexico and Wyoming. Plants grow at an elevation of 2500–3300 m. They require wet habitat including seeps, stream banks and meadows.

Taxonomy
Platanthera purpurascens was first described by Per Axel Rydberg in 1901 as Limnorchis purpurascens but later assumed to be the same species or a variation of Platanthera hyperborea or Platanthera stricta. In 1997 it was again described as a separate species, Platanthera purpurascens.

References

purpurascens
Orchids of the United States